The 2009 Judo Grand Prix Tunis was held in Tunis, Tunisia from 9 to 10 May 2009.

Medal summary

Men's events

Women's events

Source Results

Medal table

References

External links
 

2009 IJF World Tour
2009 Judo Grand Prix
Judo
Judo competitions in Tunisia
Judo
Judo